Legislative elections were held in East Bengal between 8 and 12 March 1954, the first since Pakistan became an independent country in 1947. The opposition United Front led by the Awami League and Krishak Sramik Party won a landslide victory with 223 of the 309 seats. The Muslim League Chief Minister of East Pakistan Nurul Amin was defeated in his own constituency by Khaleque Nawaz Khan by over 7,000 votes, with all the Muslim League ministers losing their seats.

Background
The Bengal Assembly had been elected as part of the provincial elections in British India in 1946. Its term was extended several times, with around 34 seats left vacant as by-elections were not held.

Electoral system
The East Bengal Legislative Assembly consisted of 309 seats, of which 228 were reserved for Muslims, 36 for scheduled castes, 12 for women (nine Muslims, one general and two scheduled caste), two for Buddhists and one for Christians. There were also 30 general seats.

A total of 19,541,563 voters were registered for the elections, of which 9,239,720 were women. Of the total voters, 15,159,825 were able to vote in the Muslim seats, 2,303,578 in the scheduled caste seats, 2,095,355 in the general seats, 136,417 in the Buddhist seats and 43,911 for the Christian seat.

Campaign
The Muslim League published its manifesto on 13 December 1953, calling for Bengali to be made an official state language, reform in agricultural and education and improvements in healthcare, and began its campaign in January 1954. The Awami League published a 41-point manifesto focusing on autonomy, political reform and nationalisation. The Communists published a 22-point manifesto on 2 December, calling for them to be the leading party in a united front against the Muslim League, as well as promoting autonomy and the recognition of Bengali.

Several opposition parties called for a creation of an opposition front, with agreement reached between the Awami League and the Krishak Sramik Party on 4 December. The Front was later joined by the Nizam-e-Islam Party and Ganatantri Dal.

A total of 1,285 candidates contested the elections; 986 for the 228 Muslim seats, 151 for the 36 scheduled caste seats, 103 for the 30 general seats, 37 for the women's seats and twelve for the two Buddhist seats. The Christian seat had only one candidate, as did the Women's general and one of the scheduled caste seats. Two general seats also had one candidate who was returned unopposed. The Muslim League and United Front ran candidates in all 237 Muslim seats.

Results
The results of 1954 elections in East Pakistan were conclusive. The United Front won 223 of the 237 Muslim seats in the provincial assembly and obtained nearly 64% of the votes. In contrast the Muslim League won only 9 seats and secured less than 27% of the votes polled in the contested constituencies. Among the most exciting aspects of the election was the defeat of several ministers including Nurul Amin, the Muslim League Chief Minister. A. K. Fazlul Huq was elected in two constituencies, forcing a by-election in one of them.

Aftermath
Following the elections, independent Assembly member Fazlal Qadir Chowdhury joined the Muslim League to give them ten seats, allowing the party to form a parliamentary group.

References

1954 elections in Pakistan
History of East Pakistan
1954